Balkrishna Ramchandra Wasnik (12 August 1929 – 10 September 2015) was an Indian politician and member of the Indian National Congress.

Political career 
In 1957, at the age of 28 he was elected in the Bhandara lok sabha constituency. He was re-elected in 1962. Afterwards from Buldhana in (1980). He was a staunch supporter of separate Vidarbha.

In 1967, he became President of the Mahavidarbha Rajya Sangharsh Samiti and mobilized the agitation to press for this demand.

Family 
He belongs to an Ambedkarite Buddhist family. He hails from Mahar community and has a son, Mukul Wasnik two daughters, Dipti Wasnik Saxena and Seema Wasnik.

Death 
He died on 10 September 2015 in Nagpur, aged 86.

References 

1929 births
2015 deaths
Indian National Congress politicians
Indian Buddhists
20th-century Buddhists
21st-century Buddhists
Marathi politicians
India MPs 1957–1962
India MPs 1962–1967